Brunslar was a short-lived municipality in North Hessen, in the now-extinct district of Melsungen, Germany. It was created during the changing of district boundaries on 1 February 1971, when the independent communities of Altenbrunslar and Neuenbrunslar fused. On the 31. December 1971 the community of Wolfershausen joined the Brunslar municipality.

At the beginning the municipality covered an area of 1271 ha, in which approx. 1300 people lived. As the village of Wolfershausen was integrated, the area grew to 1641 ha and the population grew to approx. 2000.

On 1 January 1974 the municipality of Brunslar, together with the municipalities of Gensungen, Helmshausen, Hilgershausen und Rhünda were included into the town of Felsberg.

References 

Former municipalities in Hesse